General elections were held in Nigeria between October and December 1954. The Northern People's Congress emerged as the largest party, winning 84 of the 184 seats. However, the NPC only won seats in the Northern Region. Although the National Council of Nigeria and the Cameroons won the most seats in the Eastern and Western Regions, Action Group was the only party to win seats in all three regions.

Electoral system
The elections were held using different systems in the different provinces. Direct elections were held in Lagos and the Eastern and Western regions, whilst electoral colleges were used in Southern Cameroons and Northern Region.

Half of the 184 seats were allocated to the Northern Region, 42 to each of the Eastern and Western region, six to Southern Cameroons and two to Lagos.

Results

References

Nigeria
Parliamentary elections in Nigeria
1954 elections in the British Empire
Election and referendum articles with incomplete results